Gursimran Singh Sidhu (born 11 July 1997) known professionally as Gur Sidhu is an Indian singer, record producer and song-writer associated with Punjabi Music and Punjabi cinema. He is best known for his songs "8 Parche", "Bamb Aagya", "Vaddi Galbaat", "Gabhru", "Dekhi Jau", "Ashke Ashke", "Taakre" and many more.

Music career 
Sidhu was born in Bathinda, Punjab. After graduation Sidhu moved to Canada and there he was launched by Nav Sandhu to released his first song "Moved On" on 8 May 2019. Later, his song "8 Parche" with Baani Sandhu was released in September 2019 under the label of White Hill Music. In October 2019, his song "Pyar Bolda" with Jassa Dhillon was released. He got his breakthrough with the single "Bro Oye", released by White Hill Music. In the same year he sang, wrote and composed "Challa" for the Punjabi feature film Ardab Mutiyaran starring Ninja and Sonam Bajwa.

Sidhu composed songs such as "Subaah Jatt Da" (sung by Amrit Maan), "Taare" (sung by Sidhu Moose Wala), and "Regret" (sung by R Nait). In 2020, he released "Sham Da Laara" and "Fragrance".

In 2021,Sidhu released his first debut album "Nothing Like Before".The full album proved to be successful specially songs Taakre,Dekhi Jau,Ashke Ashke,Cherry Cheeks,Dila Ve,Goli etc.

In 2022,his song "Bamb Aagya" featuring Jasmine Sandlas was featured on UK Asian Music Chart and also appeared on Youtube's Weekly Charts.

Discography

Studio albums

Extended plays

Singles discography

As lead artist & music producer

As featured artist & music producer

Soundtracks

Production discography

Albums

Singles

References 

Singers from Punjab, India
Punjabi-language singers
Musicians from Brampton
Musicians from Punjab, India
Indian male composers
Indian lyricists
21st-century Indian male singers
21st-century Indian singers
Indian Sikhs
1997 births
Living people